Bordj Omar Driss Airport  is a public use airport located near Bordj Omar Driss, Illizi, Algeria.

See also
List of airports in Algeria

References

External links 
 
 Bordj Omar Driss
 OurAirports - Bordj Omar Driss
 Great Circle Mapper

Airports in Algeria
Buildings and structures in Illizi Province